Ahmed Faris Maumoon (born 31 March 1971), commonly known as Faris, is a Maldivian politician who served as Minister of State for Economic Development from November 2013 to June 2015. He was also elected as a member of Parliament (People's Majlis) from June 2015 to May 2019 for Dhiggaru constituency.

Faris is now an active member of the Maldives Reform Movement (MRM), a political party established in 2019 by his father and former president, Maumoon Abdul Gayoom.

Personal 
One of four siblings - Dunya Maumoon, Yumna Maumoon and Ghassan Maumoon, Faris was born and raised in Malé, Maldives.

Education 
Following his GCE O Levels from Majeedhiya School in Malé, Faris sat for his GCE A levels in England. Since then, he has completed his BA (Hons) in Combined Social Sciences from the University of Durham, England and completed his MA in International Relations from the University of New South Wales in Australia.

Politics

Dhivehi Rayyithunge Party (DRP) 
In 2005, Faris was one of the first 50 signatories requesting the formation of Dhivehi Rayyithunge Party (DRP), which went on to be one of the first few political parties to be registered in Maldives. In 2008, with then President Maumoon Abdul Gayoom running for the presidential elections, Faris stepped in as DRP's campaign manager.

Progressive Party of Maldives (PPM) 
Following disputes about the party's political direction, President Gayoom left DRP to establish the Progressive Party of Maldives (PPM) in October 2011. Faris, also having left DRP, contributed as the founder of PPM and served as chair of the working group in setting up the party, and was elected Interim Council Member and was elected Council Member.

Trial and arrest 
Faris was one of the many unlawfully detained political opposition members during former President Yameen Abdul Gayoom’s term. He was arrested and detained for six months, without a trial, for alleged bribery of Members of Parliament. This was amidst calls for reform, resignation, and a motion of no-confidence, initiated and led by Faris, against former Speaker of the Parliament, Abdulla Maseeh Mohamed from the joint coalition of opposition parties. Faris led a breakaway segment of 14 MPs from PPM, effectively taking away the government's parliamentary majority.

Held without trial for several months, Faris was also recognized as a Prisoner of Conscience by Amnesty International.

Faris, along with Former President Gayoom, Qasim Ibrahim and Sheikh Imran Abdulla – opposition leaders that were unduly imprisoned before the 2018 Presidential election, were released after the Presidential Elections was succeeded by current the President, Ibrahim Mohamed Solih of the Maldivian Democratic Party (MDP).

References

Maldivian politicians
1971 births
Living people
Alumni of Durham University
University of New South Wales alumni